In set theory, the cardinality of the continuum is the cardinality or "size" of the set of real numbers , sometimes called the continuum.

The real numbers  are more numerous than the natural numbers .

This was proven by Georg Cantor in his uncountability proof of 1874, part of his groundbreaking study of different infinities. The inequality was later stated more simply in his diagonal argument in 1891. Cantor defined cardinality in terms of bijective functions: two sets have the same cardinality if, and only if, there exists a bijective function between them.

Between any two real numbers a < b, no matter how close they are to each other, there are always infinitely many other real numbers, and Cantor showed that they are as many as those contained in the whole set of real numbers. In other words, the open interval (a,b) is equinumerous with  This is also true for several other infinite sets, such as any n-dimensional Euclidean space  (see space filling curve). That is,

The truth or falsity of this hypothesis is undecidable and cannot be proven within the widely used Zermelo–Fraenkel set theory with axiom of choice (ZFC).

Properties

Uncountability
Georg Cantor introduced the concept of cardinality to compare the sizes of infinite sets. He famously showed that the set of real numbers is uncountably infinite. That is,  is strictly greater than the cardinality of the natural numbers, :

In practice, this means that there are strictly more real numbers than there are integers. Cantor proved this statement in several different ways. For more information on this topic, see Cantor's first uncountability proof and Cantor's diagonal argument.

Cardinal equalities
A variation of Cantor's diagonal argument can be used to prove Cantor's theorem, which states that the cardinality of any set is strictly less than that of its power set. That is,  (and so that the power set  of the natural numbers  is uncountable).
Let  be the set of infinite sequences with values in set . The image of this map is called the Cantor set. It is not hard to see that this map is injective, for by avoiding points with the digit 1 in their ternary expansion, we avoid conflicts created by the fact that the ternary-expansion of a real number is not unique. We then have that .
By the Cantor–Bernstein–Schroeder theorem we conclude that

The cardinal equality  can be demonstrated using cardinal arithmetic:

By using the rules of cardinal arithmetic, one can also show that

where n is any finite cardinal ≥ 2, and

Alternative explanation for 
Every real number has at least one infinite decimal expansion.  For example,

(This is true even in the case the expansion repeats, as in the first two examples.)

In any given case, the number of digits is countable since they can be put into a one-to-one correspondence with the set of natural numbers . This makes it sensible to talk about, say, the first, the one-hundredth, or the millionth digit of π. Since the natural numbers have cardinality  each real number has  digits in its expansion.

Since each real number can be broken into an integer part and a decimal fraction, we get:

where we used the fact that

and thus

Beth numbers

So  is the second beth number, beth-one:

The continuum hypothesis

The famous continuum hypothesis asserts that  is also the second aleph number, .

This statement is now known to be independent of the axioms of Zermelo–Fraenkel set theory with the axiom of choice (ZFC), as shown by Kurt Gödel and Paul Cohen. That is, both the hypothesis and its negation are consistent with these axioms. In fact, for every nonzero natural number n, the equality  =  is independent of ZFC (case  being the continuum hypothesis). The same is true for most other alephs, although in some cases, equality can be ruled out by König's theorem on the grounds of cofinality (e.g.).

Sets with cardinality of the continuum

Some common examples are the following:

Sets with greater cardinality

Sets with cardinality greater than  include:

the set 2R of indicator functions defined on subsets of the reals (the set  is isomorphic to  – the indicator function chooses elements of each subset to include)
the set of all automorphisms of the (discrete) field of complex numbers.

These all have cardinality  (beth two).

References

Bibliography 
Paul Halmos, Naive set theory. Princeton, NJ: D. Van Nostrand Company, 1960. Reprinted by Springer-Verlag, New York, 1974.  (Springer-Verlag edition).
Jech, Thomas, 2003. Set Theory: The Third Millennium Edition, Revised and Expanded.  Springer.  .
Kunen, Kenneth, 1980. Set Theory: An Introduction to Independence Proofs. Elsevier.  .

Cardinal numbers
Set theory
Infinity